Pierce O'Leary (born 5 November 1959) is an Irish former professional footballer. Pierce is the brother of former Arsenal star and fellow Irish international David O'Leary.

Playing career
Born in Dublin, O'Leary signed for Shamrock Rovers in 1977 under Johnny Giles and made his debut in October and went on to win the FAI Cup in 1978. A week after the Cup Final he signed for Philadelphia Fury where he spent three months. In 1981, he signed for Vancouver Whitecaps before joining Celtic in November 1984.

O'Leary earned youth caps and 7 Republic of Ireland national team caps while at Milltown, five Ireland U21 caps and made three appearances for Rovers in European competition. The tall centre-half made his Celtic debut in a 2–1 Scottish Cup victory at Hamilton Accies on 30 January 1985. He came on as substitute in the 1985 Scottish Cup Final as Celtic came from behind to defeat Dundee United 2–1. He then made enough appearances to claim a League Championship medal after Celtic pipped Hearts for the title on the final day of the 1985–86 season. He was forced to retire in 1988 due to recurring pelvic trouble.

Pierce's son Ryan O'Leary is also now a professional footballer and played with Kilmarnock.

Post-playing career
Prior to retiring from football in 1988, O'Leary had set up an industrial cleaning business in Glasgow in partnership with Packie Bonner. Bonner's involvement only lasted a few years, but under O'Leary the business secured numerous contracts with offices, shops and hospitals. However, O'Leary went bankrupt in March 2013 and a new business has since been set up with his wife as director.

Honours
Shamrock Rovers
 FAI Cup: 1978

Celtic
 Scottish League: 1985–86
 Scottish Cup: 1985

References

Sources
The Hoops by Paul Doolan and Robert Goggins

External links

1959 births
Living people
Celtic F.C. players
Scottish Football League players
Expatriate footballers in Scotland
Expatriate soccer players in Canada
Expatriate soccer players in the United States
Association football defenders
League of Ireland players
Irish expatriate sportspeople in Canada
Irish expatriate sportspeople in Scotland
Irish expatriate sportspeople in the United States
North American Soccer League (1968–1984) players
North American Soccer League (1968–1984) indoor players
Association footballers from Dublin (city)
Philadelphia Fury (1978–1980) players
Republic of Ireland association footballers
Republic of Ireland international footballers
Republic of Ireland under-21 international footballers
Republic of Ireland youth international footballers
Shamrock Rovers F.C. players
Vancouver Whitecaps (1974–1984) players
Stella Maris F.C. players